Frank Rader (April 8, 1848 – March 28, 1897) served as the 22nd Mayor of Los Angeles from 1894 until 1896.

He died at age 49 in Lake Elsinore, California. He is interred in Angelus-Rosedale Cemetery, Los Angeles.

References
Chronological Record of Los Angeles City Officials: 1850—1938, Compiled under Direction of Municipal Reference Library City Hall, Los Angeles March 1938 (Reprinted 1966)

Mayors of Los Angeles
1848 births
1897 deaths
Burials at Angelus-Rosedale Cemetery
19th-century American politicians